Nickel & Dime is a 1991 American comedy film written by Ben Moses, Eddy Pollon and Seth Front, directed by Moses and starring C. Thomas Howell and Wallace Shawn.

Cast
C. Thomas Howell as Jack Stone
Wallace Shawn as Everett Willits
Lise Cutter as Cathleen Markson
Roy Brocksmith as Sammy Thornton
Lynn Danielson as Destiny Charm
Kathleen Freeman as Judge Letcher

Reception
Scott Hamilton and Chris Holland of Radio Times awarded the film two stars out of five and wrote, "Never very funny, and the middle portion of the film drags terribly..."

TV Guide gave the film a negative review, describing the screenplay as "frenetic but weak-kneed and almost totally implausible."

Kevin Thomas of the Los Angeles Times gave the film a mixed review and wrote, "The film may wind up a loser, but Howell and Shawn are certainly winning."

References

External links
 
 

1990s English-language films